Kosmos 839 ( meaning Cosmos 839) was a satellite which was used as a target for tests of anti-satellite weapons. It was launched by the Soviet Union in 1976 as part of the Dnepropetrovsk Sputnik programme, and used as a target for Kosmos 843 as part of the Istrebitel Sputnikov programme.

It was launched aboard a Kosmos-3M carrier rocket, from Site 132/1 at the Plesetsk Cosmodrome. The launch occurred at 21:08 UTC on 8 July 1976.

It was successfully intercepted by Kosmos 843 on 21 July. As of 2009, debris is still in orbit.

Kosmos 839 was the third of ten Lira satellites to be launched, of which all but the first were successful. Lira was derived from the earlier DS-P1-M satellite, which it replaced.

See also

1976 in spaceflight

References

1976 in spaceflight
1976 in the Soviet Union
Intentionally destroyed artificial satellites
Kosmos satellites
Spacecraft launched in 1976
Dnepropetrovsk Sputnik program